Shaded Red was a Christian alternative rock band from Denver, Colorado, in the United States. It was formed in 1993 by brothers Jamie Roberts (vocals and guitar) and Jonathan Roberts (guitars, bass, trumpet, piano). In 1997 they released their debut self-titled album through Cadence. On January 17, 1998, the band was struck by tragedy when their van hit a patch of black ice returning from a concert. Drummer Chris Yeoman was killed and Jon Roberts was left with a shattered pelvis. It was at this time the band considered calling it quits but decided to press on instead.

In 1999, the band released their second album, Red Revolution. The album was a moderate success and features a remake of the Benny Hester song "When God Ran". The band has since broken up, and brothers Jamie and Jonathan currently reside in Los Angeles.

Discography 
 Shaded Red (1997)
 Caught
 Collide
 Let It Out
 Faker
 Found Someone
 Something
 Falling For You
 Dreamin
 Fear Not
 Far Away
 Sunk
 Use Me
 Love, Peace and Joy (1997) Christmas compilation
 Silent Night
 Angels
 Red Revolution (1999)
 Revolution
 Hello
 Innocence
 Wait
 When God Ran
 About My Love
 Slow Suicide
 One Year
 Touch
 Rat Race
 Endless Summer Days
 Tonight

References

External links
Article on the band
Bio on Christianmusic.com

Alternative rock groups from Colorado
Musical groups established in 1993
Musical groups disestablished in 2000
American Christian rock groups
1993 establishments in Colorado